Bornite, also known as peacock ore, is a sulfide mineral with chemical composition Cu5FeS4 that crystallizes in the orthorhombic system (pseudo-cubic).

Appearance

Bornite has a brown to copper-red color on fresh surfaces that tarnishes to various iridescent shades of blue to purple in places. Its striking iridescence gives it the nickname peacock copper or peacock ore.

Mineralogy
Bornite is an important copper ore mineral and occurs widely in porphyry copper deposits along with the more common chalcopyrite. Chalcopyrite and bornite are both typically replaced by chalcocite and covellite in the supergene enrichment zone of copper deposits.  Bornite is also found as disseminations in mafic igneous rocks, in contact metamorphic skarn deposits, in pegmatites and in sedimentary cupriferous shales. It is important as an ore for its copper content of about 63 percent by mass.

Structure

At temperatures above , the structure is isometric with a unit cell that is about 5.50 Å on an edge. This structure is based on cubic close-packed sulfur atoms, with copper and iron atoms randomly distributed into six of the eight tetrahedral sites located in the octants of the cube. With cooling, the Fe and Cu become ordered, so that 5.5 Å subcells in which all eight tetrahedral sites are filled alternate with subcells in which only four of the tetrahedral sites are filled; symmetry is reduced to orthorhombic.

Composition
Substantial variation in the relative amounts of copper and iron is possible and solid solution extends towards chalcopyrite (CuFeS2) and digenite (Cu9S5). Exsolution of blebs and lamellae of chalcopyrite, digenite, and chalcocite is common.

Form and twinning
Rare crystals are approximately cubic, dodecahedral, or octahedral. Usually massive. Penetration twinning on the crystallographic direction, {111}.

Occurrence

It occurs globally in copper ores with notable crystal localities in Butte, Montana and at Bristol, Connecticut in the U.S. It is also collected from the Carn Brea mine, Illogan, and elsewhere in Cornwall, England. Large crystals are found from the Frossnitz Alps, eastern Tirol, Austria; the Mangula mine, Lomagundi district, Zimbabwe; from the N'ouva mine, Talate, Morocco, the West Coast of Tasmania and in Dzhezkazgan, Kazakhstan. There are also traces of it found amongst the hematite in the Pilbara region of Western Australia.

History and etymology
It was first described in 1725 for an occurrence in the Krušné Horny Mountains (Erzgebirge), Karlovy Vary Region, Bohemia in what is now the Czech Republic. It was named in 1845 for Austrian mineralogist Ignaz von Born (born as Born Ignác into a Hungarian family) (1742–1791).

See also
Cuprite
Tennantite
Tetrahedrite
List of minerals named after people

References

Bibliography
Palache, C., H. Berman, and C. Frondel (1944) Dana’s system of mineralogy, (7th edition), v. I, 195–197.
Manning, P.G. (1966) A study of the bonding Properties of Sulphur in Bornite, The Canadian Mineralogist, 9, 85-94

Copper ores
Iron minerals
Sulfide minerals
Orthorhombic minerals
Minerals in space group 61